Orthotyphlus is a genus of ground beetles in the family Carabidae. This genus has a single species, Orthotyphlus franzi. It is found in New Caledonia.

References

Trechinae